The fifth season of the military science fiction television series Stargate SG-1 commenced airing on Showtime in the United States on June 29, 2001, concluded on Sky1 in the United Kingdom on February 6, 2002, and contained 22 episodes. The fifth season introduces future main character Jonas Quinn portrayed by Corin Nemec from 2002–2004. The fifth season is about the ongoing war with the Goa'uld Empire after the death of Apophis at the start of the season and the rise of a new System Lord named Anubis. SG-1, a military-science team, are set to explore the Milky Way Galaxy.

The one-hour premiere "Enemies", which debuted on June 29, 2001 on Showtime had the lowest syndication of the seasons episode, but overall got a high viewership level. This would be the last season to feature Apophis alive, but he would return in dreams and alternate realities and timelines. The series was developed by Brad Wright and Jonathan Glassner. Season five regular cast members include Richard Dean Anderson, Michael Shanks, Amanda Tapping, Christopher Judge, and Don S. Davis.

Production
Many crew members appeared in "Wormhole X-Treme!", the 100th episode of Stargate SG-1. The director of a Wormhole X-Treme! episode, played by Peter DeLuise, was the director of this Stargate SG-1 episode. A Wormhole X-Treme! writer is played by Robert C. Cooper, a Stargate SG-1 writer and executive producer. Further cameos include Joseph Mallozzi (who co-wrote this episode), producer N. John Smith, and Stargate SG-1 writer Ron Wilkerson as Wormhole X-Treme! crew members; Stargate SG-1 property master David Sinclair as the Wormhole X-Treme! assistant director; make-up artist Jan Newman as a make-up artist; director Andy Mikita and producer John Lenic as the characters being beaten by Col. Danning; Stargate SG-1 director Martin Wood as an NID agent; and several more. The two executives who commented on how unrealistic Lloyd's spacecraft looked are played by Stargate SG-1 executive producer Michael Greenburg and executive producer/co-creator Brad Wright.

In "Proving Ground", Elisabeth Rosen appears as Lieutenant Jennifer Hailey, who originally appeared in the episode "Prodigy". Courtenay J. Stevens appears as Lieutenant Elliot, a role which he would reprise in the episodes "Summit" and "Last Stand".  He would also later appear in the first season of Stargate Atlantis, playing the role of Keras in "Childhood's End." David Kopp appears as Lieutenant Grogan, who would return in Season Five episode "The Sentinel". Grace Park, famed for her appearance on the re-imagined Battlestar Galactica as Sharon Valerii, makes an appearance as Lieutenant Satterfield. "48 Hours" marks the first appearance of David Hewlett as Rodney McKay. He would recur in future Stargate SG-1 episodes and join the main cast of Stargate Atlantis. For "Summit", Martouf was originally meant to appear, having survived "Divide and Conquer." However, J. R. Bourne was unavailable for filming, which necessitated developing a new host for Lantash.

Jonas Quinn makes his first appearance in "Meridian", and goes on to take Daniel Jackson's place on SG-1 throughout season six. Jackson does not appear in "Revelations". However, it is implied at the end that the breeze SG-1 feels is Daniel. Michael Shanks does appear as the voice of Thor. This is the last episode where Michael Shanks would be listed in the main cast until season seven. Teryl Rothery who portrayed Janet Fraiser does the voice of Heimdall.  According to the episode audio commentary, Rothery performed her lines on-set to help give the actors a reference point. However, Richard Dean Anderson, Christopher Judge and Rothery could not keep a straight face as the eye line they were given was a blinking light in Rothery's chest. This episode ended the SG-1 tradition of ending the season with a cliffhanger until Season 9.

Reception
"Enemies" was nominated for an Emmy in the category "Outstanding Special Visual Effects for a Series" and a Gemini Award in the category "Best Visual Effects". For "Ascension", Amanda Tapping won a Leo Award in the category "Dramatic Series: Best Lead Performance – Female". For "Proving Ground", Andy Mikita was nominated for a Leo Award in the category "Dramatic Series: Best Director". "The Warrior" was nominated for a Leo Award in the category "Dramatic Series: Best Overall Sound". "Revelations" was nominated for an Emmy in the category "Outstanding Special Visual Effects for a Series", and won a Gemini Award in the category "Best Visual Effects".

Main cast
 Starring Richard Dean Anderson as Colonel Jack O'Neill
 Michael Shanks as Dr. Daniel Jackson
 Amanda Tapping as Major Samantha Carter
 With Christopher Judge as Teal'c
 And Don S. Davis as Major General George Hammond

Episodes

Episodes in bold are continuous episodes, where the story spans over 2 or more episodes.

Home media

Footnotes

References

External links

 Season 5 on GateWorld
 Season 5 on IMDb
 Season 5 on TV.com
 

 05
2001 American television seasons
2002 American television seasons
SG-1 05
2001 Canadian television seasons
2002 Canadian television seasons